The  is a funicular line operated by Kurama-dera, a famous Buddhist temple in Mount Kurama, Sakyō, Kyoto, Japan. The line is officially called .

Basic data
Distance: 
Vertical interval: 
Gauge: 
Stations: 2
Track: Single track

Overview
The funicular line serves for the visitors to Kurama-dera temple built in 770. As the temple resides in the heart of the Mount Kurama, it takes roughly 30 minutes on foot from the  while the funicular line links the same route in just 2 minutes. The temple, however, recommends its visitors not to use the funicular, but to walk on foot if possible to feel stronger impressions.

This is also the shortest line in the country, if considered as a railway. The line has only single car, counterbalanced by a weight. The line opened on January 1, 1957, as an ordinary iron-wheeled funicular with two cars,  gauge, later changed in 1996 as the current rubber-tired system with  gauge. 

The car in use as at March 2006 was nicknamed Ushiwaka-gō III, after Minamoto no Yoshitsune (called Ushiwakamaru in his childhood), who was put and got training in the temple. By May 2018 the car in use was "Ushiwaka IV".

As of March 2015, the fare to ride was 200 yen.

Stations 
Sanmon Station (山門): Transfer to Kurama, Eizan Electric Railway Kurama Line (5 minutes walk).
Tahōtō Station (多宝塔)

See also
Funicular railway
List of funicular railways
List of railway lines in Japan

Funicular railways in Japan
800 mm gauge railways in Japan
2 ft 6 in gauge railways in Japan
1957 establishments in Japan